Mezala is a village in the Boumerdès Province in Kabylie, Algeria.

Location
The village is surrounded by Meraldene River and the town of Thenia in the Khachna mountain range.

Notable people

Fodil Mezali, an Algerian journalist and writer

References

Villages in Algeria
Boumerdès Province
Kabylie